Sinopanax formosanus is a species of flowering plant in the family Araliaceae and the only species in the genus Sinopanax. It is endemic to Taiwan.

References

Araliaceae
Monotypic Apiales genera
Vulnerable plants
Endemic flora of Taiwan
Trees of Taiwan